Păuleni may refer to several places in Romania:

 Păuleni, a village in Șuici Commune, Argeș County
 Păuleni, a village in Lupeni Commune, Harghita County
 Păuleni-Ciuc, a commune in Harghita County, Romania

See also 
 Păulești (disambiguation)
 Păuleasca (disambiguation)